Hidden Treasures Miss Nepal 2011, the 15th Miss Nepal beauty pageant was held on the August 30, 2011, at the Tribhuvan Army Club in Kathmandu. The new main sponsor for the event Dabur Nepal was Lux. This year, 19 young women aged 19 years and above, had been shortlisted for the final from across the country. Sadichha Shrestha Miss Nepal 2010 winner, crowned her successor in the finale event at Tribhuvan Army Club. The winner, Malina Joshi, represented Nepal in the international pageants of Miss World 2011.  First Runner Up Anupama Aura Gurung represented Nepal at Miss Earth 2011, and Sarina Maskey went to the Miss International 2011.

Results

Color keys

Sub-titles

Judges
 Manisha Koirala - Bollywood Actress
 Zenisha Moktan - Miss Nepal 2009
 Yogeshwar Amatya - Singer
 Rajendra Bajagain
 Ajaya Bhadra Khanal - Editor of The Himalayan Times Newspaper
 Promi Pradhan - HR Professional who works at Himalayan Bank
 Shailaja Adhikary - Director of the IEC fashion school
 Shreejana Rana - Entrepreneur
 Ritu Singh Vaidya - Miss India 1991
 Deepak Kharel - Singer
 Yeso Bardhan Pradhan - Chief Judge

Contestants

Notes
 Contestant #05, Neha Paudel was selected as the first in Little Miss Birgunj 2003.
 Contestant #07, Malina Joshi was top 5 finalist in Miss Angel 2010.
 Contestant #08, Shreeja Shrestha is the 2nd Runner Up in the Miss Newa 2008 contest.
 Contestant #10, Pratibha Shrestha was crowned as Miss Purbanchal 2011.
 Contestant #13, Madina Begum is the first ever Muslim contestant to take part in Miss Nepal beauty pageant.
 Contestant #15, Bishnu Chemjong had won the all-Nepal singing competition, Nepal Star in 2006.
 Contestant #17, Biki Gadtaula was 2nd Runner Up in Miss Global Nepal 2010.
 Contestant #19, Anupama Aura Gurung was contestant in Miss Mongol 2010 and won the Miss Personality title.

References

External links
 Miss Nepal Official Website
 Miss Nepal 2011 Contestants

Beauty pageants in Nepal
2011 in Nepal
Miss Nepal